WOBT is a radio station in Rhinelander, Wisconsin. It airs a sports format.

History
On February 13, 2012, WOBT changed their format from sports to classic country.

On March 21, 2012, WOBT began rebroadcasting on FM translator W267AF 101.3 FM.

On January 5, 2021, WOBT changed their format from classic country to sports, branded as "101.3 & 1240 The Game".

Previous logo

References

External links

OBT
NRG Media radio stations
Sports radio stations in the United States